Leslie Blau (known in Hungarian language as Blau Laszlo) was a noted author, historian, and survivor of the Holocaust.

Blau was born in Budapest, Hungary in 1921. He studied in the Jewish High School of Budapest. As a youngster, he spent his summer months in the town of Bonyhád. He survived the horrors committed on the Jews during World War II by a stroke of luck, and after the war, he settled in the town on Bonyhad, where he married a local girl, Sara Kuttner. In 1956, during the Hungarian Revolution of 1956, he and his family fled communist Hungary for a safer haven: USA. He arrived in Boro Park, Brooklyn, New York where he has lived for over fifty years.

After five years of extensive investigation and research, Mr. Blau finally published his work, "Bonyhad: A Destroyed Community" in 1994. . In 2008, a Hungarian translation of the book was published with the amended title, "Bonyhad: A Destroyed Jewish Community", in Hungarian, "Bonyhad: Egy Elpusztitot Zsido Kozosseg". The author visited Bonyhad with his wife, daughter and nephew for a presentation of the book at Bonyhad's City Hall, where he was presented a Distinguished Citizen of Bonyhad award by Mayor Potapi Arpad. Just prior to his trip to Hungary he was the subject of a profile, "A Brooklyn Gentleman", by Reuters correspondent, Mirjam Donath.

Mr. Blau's research has been cited by such prestigious scholars as Sir Martin Gilbert.

As an active member of the Jewish community in Boro Park, Mr. Blau sat on the executive committee of B'nai Israel of Linden Heights. He also hosted there a yearly event to recount tales of the Holocaust for the benefit of the next generation.

He died in October 2021 at the age of 100 .

Works
 A Destroyed Community'' (1994, Shengold Publishings), original edition
 Leslie Blau/Blau László: Bonyhád, egy elpusztított zsidó közösség. A magyarországi Bonyhád zsidóságának története; Soha többé Soá! Alapítvány, Bonyhád, 2008, Hungarian translation
 בונ'האד: חורבן קהילה יהודיה, Hebrew translation (edited by Rabbi Reuven Chaim Klein)

References

1921 births
2021 deaths
Holocaust survivors
Hungarian Jews
20th-century Hungarian historians
Hungarian emigrants to the United States
Writers from Budapest
People from Borough Park, Brooklyn